Taoyuan City Constituency 5 includes Pingzhen and Longtan in southern Taoyuan City. The district was formerly known as Taoyuan County Constituency 5 (2008-2014) and was created in 2008, when all local constituencies of the Legislative Yuan were reorganized to become single-member districts.

Current district
 Pingzhen
 Longtan

Legislators

Election results

 

 
 
 
 
 
 
 
 
 
 

Constituencies in Taoyuan City